was a baseball stadium in Arakawa, Tokyo, Japan.  It was the home of the Lotte Orions until they moved to Miyagi Baseball Stadium in Sendai in 1972.  The stadium was opened in 1962 and had a capacity of 35,000 people.

Defunct baseball venues in Japan
Sports venues in Tokyo
Chiba Lotte Marines
Arakawa, Tokyo
Sports venues completed in 1962
Sports venues demolished in 1977
1962 establishments in Japan
1977 disestablishments in Japan
Demolished buildings and structures in Japan